Acleris imitatrix is a species of moth of the family Tortricidae. It is found in China (Chekiang).

The wingspan is about 16 mm.

References

Moths described in 1975
imitatrix
Moths of Asia